The Anglican Diocese of Idah is one of 11 within the Anglican Province of Lokoja, one of the 14 provinces within the Church of Nigeria. The current bishop is Joseph Musa.  The Rt Revd Joseph Musa was consecrated on 13 March, 2005 as the new  Bishop of Idah. Idah dioceses is among the 17 dioceses of the Abuja Province, which was created on  14 March 2005.

The Diocese Bishop's Lodge is situated in Idah, Kogi State, Nigeria.

Notes

Dioceses of the Province of Lokoja
Church of Nigeria dioceses